The Kossoy Sisters are identical twin sisters (Irene Saletan and Ellen Christenson) who performed American folk and old-time music. Irene sang mezzo-soprano vocal, and Ellen supplied soprano harmony, with Irene on guitar and Ellen playing the five-string banjo in a traditional up-picking technique. Their performances were notable examples of close harmony singing. They began performing professionally in their mid-teens and are esteemed as a significant part of the popular folk music movement that started in the mid-1950s.

Career
When they were 17, the Kossoy Sisters recorded the album Bowling Green, which features close harmonies, with instrumental accompaniment by Erik Darling. The two were introduced to a new audience when their version of "I'll Fly Away" from this album was used in the 2000 film O Brother, Where Art Thou?. Another song from the same album, the Kossoys' version of "Single Girl, Married Girl", is heard on the soundtrack of the 2014 film release Obvious Child.

The sisters performed at the first Newport Folk Festival in 1959 and returned to Newport to perform again in 2012, over 50 years later. Producer Harold Leventhal included them in the March 17, 1956 Bound for Glory tribute/benefit concert at New York's Pythian Hall for the hospitalized Woody Guthrie and his children. They sang three of Guthrie's songs, exhibiting "sweet harmonizing," as Pete Seeger later recounted. In 1971 and other occasions they performed at the Fox Hollow Folk Festival in Petersburgh, New York.

Irene and her former husband Tony Saletan performed together, during their marriage, as Tony and Irene Saletan. In 1964, the couple also joined with Jackie Washington Landrón to form the Boston Folk Trio, to present school concerts through the non-profit Young Audiences Arts for Learning. The Saletans released an album together, Folk Songs and Ballads, in 1970 on Folk-Legacy Records. Irene and Tony also released a seven-inch vinyl recording of four songs for the Boston Mutual Life Insurance Company, titled The Ballad of Boston and Other New England Folk Tunes, and Revolutionary Tea (with Irene listed as one of the Yankee Tunesmiths), on Old North Bridge Records, 1975.

A second Kossoy Sisters CD, Hop on Pretty Girls, appeared in 2002 on the Living Folk label. A noncommercial CD, Kossoy Sisters, is available from Public Radio Station WBUR in Boston. It is a recording of an interview with the twins on February 23, 2003, during their promotional tour for "Hop on Pretty Girls." Over the years, the sisters also made live appearances together from time to time. They toured California in 1981 and have appeared in the Boston area, Washington DC, New York, Pinewoods Camp, various venues in the St. Louis area, and numerous other locations.

Personal lives
Irene and Ellen Kossoy were born on May 11, 1938, in New York City. The twins began singing together at about the age of six, in imitation of harmonies created in the home by their mother and aunt. At 15, they attended a summer camp at which Pete Seeger and other well-known folk singers often performed, and they developed a life-long attachment to the genre. They quickly discovered the bustling folk music scene in the Greenwich Village section of New York City and mingled with the people who congregated in Washington Square Park.

The Kossoys attended local schools in New York City and went on to graduate from Blackburn College in Carlinville, Illinois. Soon after completion of their formal studies, each of the sisters married. Ellen moved to St. Louis and Irene settled in the Boston area. Ellen has a son and a daughter, and Irene has a son and a daughter. Each of the sisters later divorced, after which they again became housemates. As of 2022, they were retired and living together in Guatemala.

Discography
 Bowling Green, Tradition 1956 – rereleased by Rykodisc in 1996, released again by Rykodisc as part of the three-disc set The Best of the Bluegrass Tradition (although the music on the Kossoys' recording is not bluegrass)
 Hop on Pretty Girls, Living Folk 2002
 Kossoy Sisters – recording of an interview from the National Public Radio program "On Point", February 23, 2003
 Banjo Music of the Southern Appalachians, Erik Darling, Olympic (date unknown) (The Kossoy Sisters appear on this record.)
 Instrumental Music and Songs of Southern Appalachians, Erik Darling (The last 10 tracks of this CD, uncredited but all sung by the Kossoy Sisters, appear to be copied from Banjo Music of the Southern Appalachians.)

References

External links
 Official website
 "The Kossoy Sisters" – Linda Seida, AllMusic
 "O Kossoy Sisters Where Art Thou Been?" – Jon Johnson, Country Standard Time (January 2003)

Living people
1938 births
20th-century American women singers
American folk singers
Folk musicians from Chicago
Old Town School of Folk musicians
Family musical groups
Tradition Records artists
Singers from Illinois
21st-century American women singers
20th-century American singers
21st-century American singers